Judan (also Romanized as Jūdān, Joodan, and Jowdān) is a village in Baqerabad Rural District, in the Central District of Mahallat County, Markazi Province, Iran. At the 2006 census, its population was 101, in 29 families.

References 

Populated places in Mahallat County